Qi Baoxiang is a female former international table tennis player from China.

Table tennis career
From 1981 to 1985 she won several medals in singles, doubles, and team events in the Asian Table Tennis Championships and four medals in the World Table Tennis Championships.

The four World Championship medals included a gold medal in the Corbillon Cup (team event) at the 1981 World Table Tennis Championships for China.

Personal life
She is the sister of Chai Po Wa (pronounced Qi Baohua in Mandarin), also a table tennis player.

See also
 List of table tennis players
 List of World Table Tennis Championships medalists

References

Chinese female table tennis players
Living people
Table tennis players from Baoding
Year of birth missing (living people)